Marty Wombacher (born ) is an American writer and photojournalist, 

Wombacher's first publishing success was Trivial Trivia, The Idiot Edition, which he created  The 1985 game was a satire of Trivial Pursuit and it became a success  The U.P.I. wire service picked the story up and it was featured in newspapers, radio shows and TV news across the country. The peak of the success came when Wombacher and Owens appeared on The Today Show in New York City and were interviewed by Jane Pauley in 1986.

 to 1993 he was  one of the primary writers for People of Peoria (later shortened to POP) magazine. The magazine was published and distributed out of Peoria, Illinois. 

In 1993, Wombacher moved to New York City 

From 1993 to 2000 he was the editor, publisher and primary writer for fishwrap magazine, a satirical magazine whose focus was mainstream media, in particular magazines. The magazine was based out of New York City 

In 2002, Wombacher wrote the book 99 Beers Off The Wall.  He wrote another book, The Boy Who Would Be A Fire Truck, in 2008.

He's currently blogging at Meanwhile, Back In Peoria...

References

Wombacher on The Morning Show in Australia
Splice Today: Drinking Beer With Marty Wombacher — interview video

365 Bars at Cleveland.com

NBC Niteside feature article

External links 
 365 Beers Website
 Marty After Dark Website
 Tripping With Marty Website
 Meanwhile, Back In Peoria...

Year of birth missing (living people)
1950s births
Living people
American bloggers
American magazine publishers (people)
American male journalists
American photojournalists
Writers from Peoria, Illinois
21st-century American non-fiction writers
American male bloggers